Laurent Didier (born 19 July 1984) is a Luxembourgish former professional road bicycle racer, who competed between 2006 and 2018 for the , Designa Køkken,  and  teams.

Career
Didier is from Dippach, Luxembourg and his ancestors are no strangers to the world of cycling. His father, Lucien Didier, was part of winning team time trial squads in the Tour de France and the Giro d'Italia, and his grandfather Bim Diederich won three stages of the Tour and wore the yellow jersey for three days. Laurent is good in various terrains which makes him useful in different kinds of races.

From October 2008 to early February 2009, Didier rode for Danish , and then moved home to Designa Køkken, also in Denmark. In 2009, he finished second at the Luxembourgish National Road Race Championships behind Andy Schleck and was also runner-up in the Luxembourgish National Time Trial Championships behind Kim Kirchen.

To most cycling experts it was a huge surprise that Didier was selected for the 2013 Tour de France, at the expense of former Belgian champion Stijn Devolder.

Major results
Source: 

2005
 1st  Road race, National Under-23 Road Championships
 3rd Overall Flèche du Sud
1st Stage 3a
 6th GP Möbel Alvisse
 9th Overall Stuttgart–Straßburg
2006
 8th Rund um Düren
2007
 1st Saargau
 1st Stage 2 Oberösterreich Rundfahrt
 3rd Time trial, National Road Championships
 8th Ronde van Overijssel
2009
 National Road Championships
2nd Road race
2nd Time trial
 6th Overall Tour de Normandie
2010
 9th Overall Vuelta a la Comunidad de Madrid
2011
 National Road Championships
3rd Road race
3rd Time trial
2012
 1st  Road race, National Road Championships
 1st  Mountains classification, Tour de Wallonie
2013
 1st  Mountains classification, Tour du Haut Var
 2nd Time trial, National Road Championships
2014
 1st  Time trial, National Road Championships
 1st Stage 5 USA Pro Challenge
2015
 1st Stage 1 (TTT) Tour of Alberta
 3rd Time trial, National Road Championships
2016
 10th Overall Tour of Utah

Grand Tour general classification results timeline

References

External links

 Team Saxo Bank profile
 

1984 births
Living people
People from Dippach
Luxembourgian male cyclists
Cyclists at the 2012 Summer Olympics
Olympic cyclists of Luxembourg